S Coronae Borealis (S CrB) is a Mira variable star in the constellation Corona Borealis. Its apparent magnitude varies between 5.8 and 14.1, with a period of 360 days—just under a year. Within the constellation, it lies to the west of Theta Coronae Borealis, and around 1 degree southeast of the eclipsing binary star U Coronae Borealis.

Variability
S Coronae Borealis was discovered to vary in brightness by German amateur astronomer Karl Ludwig Hencke in 1860. It was classified as a long period variable star as other similar objects were discovered, and later as a Mira variable. The maximum range of variation is from magnitude 5.8 to 14.1 although individual maxima and minima can vary in brightness. The period of 360 days is fairly predictable.

Properties
S Coronae Borealis is a cool red giant on the asymptotic giant branch (AGB). It pulsates, which causes its radius and temperature to change. One calculation found a temperature range of 2,350 K to 2,600 K, although a more modern calculation gives a temperature of 2,864 K. Similarly a calculation of the varying radius gives  although a modern calculation of the radius gives . The bolometric luminosity varies much less than the visual magnitude and is estimated to be . Its parallax has been measured by very-long-baseline interferometry (VLBI), yielding a result of 2.39 ± 0.17 millarcseconds, which converts to a distance of 1300 ± 100 light-years.

The masses of AGB stars are poorly known and cannot be calculated from their physical properties, but they can be estimated using asteroseismology. The pulsations of S Coronae Borealis lead to a mass estimate of 1.34 times that of the Sun.

References

Corona Borealis
Mira variables
Coronae Borealis, S
M-type giants
136753
BD+31 2725
075143
Emission-line stars